Mergellina is an underground metro station that serve Line 6 on the Naples Metro. It was opened on 4 February 2007 as part of the inaugural section of Line 6 between Mergellina and Mostra.

Overview
Mergellina, designed by Lampugnani and entry into service February 4, 2007, is the current terminus of the Line 6 while waiting for the line to be extended to Municipio: there are two binary logs. As with the entire line, passenger traffic is still at most, given the small size of the line.
In 2008 the station work continues to connect to the train station and Metro Napoli Mergellina, one of the main stations of Naples, in which you can take the metro Line 2.
Station is reached by passing under the bridge of the metro Line 2.
Mergellina is part of the Art Stations and has been decorated with works by Merz. Another special feature of the station is the inclined elevator.

The previous station is Arco Mirelli, the next is Lala.

See also
Napoli Mergellina railway station
Railway stations in Italy
List of Naples metro stations

References

Naples Metro stations
2007 establishments in Italy
Railway stations opened in 2007
Railway stations in Italy opened in the 21st century